Robert Maynard (born 1962) is an American businessman. Maynard is the co-founder of LifeLock, Internet America, and SurchX, as well as of several smaller companies. Internet America and LifeLock both went public and were subsequently sold for large returns. His most recent company, SurchX, was sold to Interpayments in 2020.

Although he had an early life with many signals of illness, Maynard was not diagnosed with  Bipolar disorder until 2001, by which time he had already been the founder of Internet America, which went public in 1998. He then went on to co-found Lifelock with Todd Davis in 2005, resigning from his position at LifeLock in 2007 due to problems related to his condition.  He relocated to Hawaii in 2008 and started a water sports company, Kandoo.

Now the CMO of eSure.ai, a cybersecurity company that seeks to modernize the anti-virus industry, Maynard also regularly speaks and writes about what it is like to live with bipolar disorder. His e-book, 1 F*ckedUpDude, became an instant Amazon bestseller.

Early life
Maynard was born in 1962 in Phoenix, Arizona, enlisted in the US Marine Corps in 1981 and served until 1985. He then took a commission as a Second Lieutenant in the US Army Reserve. He served as an officer in the Army's 12th Special Forces Group for nine years.

He attended Northern Arizona University from 1985 until 1987 where he graduated in five semesters with honors that included the Wall Street Journal Award, Distinguished Military Scholar, induction into Beta Gamma Sigma and nomination for the Truman Scholarship for excellence in leadership and academics.

Career
In the late 1990s Maynard had success as the founder of Internet America, an ISP he founded from his home. Within 4 years the company had grown to over 145,000 subscribers.

Shortly after departing Internet America, Maynard founded Dotsafe. It became a provider of Internet filtering for education and uncovered multiple online predators. The company eventually folded in 2001 after the dot com bubble burst and Maynard became ill with what was later diagnosed as bipolar disorder. 
Following his diagnosis, Maynard became the co-founder of LifeLock in 2005, along with Todd Davis. LifeLock specialized in identity theft protection. The system  created by Maynard and Davis was intended to detect fraudulent actions for a variety of financial services. Over the next couple of years, the company expanded quickly and was recognized by many as an upcoming company.

Because of earlier adverse publicity, Maynard elected to resign from his position at LifeLock as it prepared to IPO.  Following his resignation, it was reported that Electronic Convulsive Therapy (ECT) had affected his memory of the incident in his past that led to his resignation and his claim that he had no memory of the incident. He moved with his family to Oahu, Hawaii, where he started a water sports business called Kandoo. The company folded a number of months later following financial problems.

Maynard also registered the website iValidate.me, which he thought might become an online consumer-direct credit bureau when fully launched, according to Maynard's LinkedIn profile.

Instead, he gathered a team of friends and former employees around him and founded SurchX back in Phoenix. SurchX is an enterprise SaaS company that levels the playing field for merchants against bigger players by allowing them to recover their credit card processing fees through surcharging, which is now legal in 44 states. SurchX was sold to Interpayments in 2020.

Personal life
In the late 1990s while the CEO of Dotsafe, Maynard began to suffer from an as yet undiagnosed illness that affected his work. Maynard has said on his website that the condition affected all aspects of his life and even led him to a divorce. After Dotsafe folded during the dotcom bust in 2001, Maynard sought further medical advice on his condition and was eventually diagnosed with bipolar disorder.

Maynard has been an advocate for bipolar disorder patients since then, His disorder was a major factor in him leaving LifeLock. In an effort to seek a cure, he underwent Electroconvulsive Therapy (ECT). This therapy was claimed by Maynard to be the main reason for many of his confusing statements about his past, as the treatment affected his memory.

Maynard is still a speaker and writer about Bipolar disorder.

See also
FICO
LifeLock 
Todd Davis

References

Living people
21st-century American businesspeople
Businesspeople from Phoenix, Arizona
Northern Arizona University alumni
1962 births